This article covers the phonological system of South African English (SAE) as spoken by White South Africans. While there is some variation among speakers, SAE typically has a number of features in common with English as it is spoken in southern England (in places like London), such as non-rhoticity and the – split.

The  vowel is characteristically back in the General and Broad varieties of SAE.

General South African English features phonemic vowel length (so that ferry  and fairy  as well as cot  and cart  differ only in length) as well as phonemic roundedness, so that fairy  is distinguished from furry  by roundedness.

Vowels
The vocalic phonemes of South African English are as follows:

 The original short front vowels ,  and  underwent a vowel shift similar to that found in New Zealand English, though not as extreme:
However, the new prestige value in younger Johannesburg speakers of the General variety (particularly those who live in the wealthy northern suburbs) seems to be open front , the same as in Modern RP.
Variants above the close-mid height are typical of female speech.
Due to weak vowel merger, neither Lenin and Lennon nor except and accept are distinct in SAE: . The quality of the merged vowel is typically  ( in some Broad varieties), even in unstressed closed syllables. This means that all three vowels of limited  are phonetically the same: . These variants are covered by the symbol  (without the lowering diacritic) in phonetic transcription.
 In the Cultivated variety, Lenin  and except  on the one hand and Lennon  and accept  on the other may be distinct, as in RP. The  quality occurs also in happy  and immediately  (cf. General ). For this reason, this variety is analysed as containing an extra  phoneme.
 The  vowel  is a long close front monophthong , either close to cardinal  or slightly mid-centralised. It does not have a tendency to diphthongise, which distinguishes SAE from Australian and New Zealand English.
 The  vowel  is typically a weakly rounded retracted central vowel , somewhat more central than the traditional RP value. Younger speakers of the General variety (especially females) often use a fully central . Backer and sometimes more rounded variants occur before . Broad SAE can feature a more rounded vowel, but that is more common in Afrikaans English.
Younger (particularly female) speakers of the General variety use an even more front vowel , so that food  may be distinguished from feed  only by rounding. The vowel is often a monophthong, but there is some tendency to diphthongise it before sonorants (as in wounded  and school ).
The monophthonging of  can cause intelligibility problems for outsiders; Roger Lass says that he himself once misunderstood the phrase the total onslaught  for the turtle onslaught . On the other hand,  does not monophthongize.

Transcriptions 
Sources differ in the way they transcribe South African English. The differences are listed below. The traditional phonemic orthography for the Received Pronunciation as well as the reformed phonemic orthographies for Australian and New Zealand English have been added for the sake of comparison.

Consonants

Plosives
 In Broad White South African English, voiceless plosives tend to be unaspirated in all positions, which serves as a marker of this subvariety. This is usually thought to be an Afrikaans influence.
 General and Cultivated varieties aspirate  before a stressed syllable, unless they are followed by an  within the same syllable.
  are normally alveolar. In the Broad variety, they tend to be dental . This pronunciation also occurs in older speakers of the Jewish subvariety of General SAE.

Fricatives and affricates
  occurs only in words borrowed from Afrikaans and Khoisan, such as gogga  'insect'. Many speakers realise  as uvular , a sound which is more common in Afrikaans.
This is especially common word-finally (as in myth ).
 In Indian variety, the labiodental fricatives  are realised without audible friction, i.e. as approximants .
 In General and Cultivated varieties, intervocalic  may be voiced, so that ahead can be pronounced .
  states that:
 It is often deleted, e.g. in word-initial stressed syllables (as in house), but at least as often, it is pronounced even if it seems deleted. The vowel that follows the  allophone in the word-initial syllable often carries a low or low rising tone, which, in rapid speech, can be the only trace of the deleted . That creates potentially minimal tonal pairs like oh (neutral  or high falling , phonemically ) vs. hoe (low  or low rising , phonemically ).
  states that in Broad varieties close to Afrikaans English,  is voiced  before a stressed vowel.

Sonorants
 General and Broad varieties have a wine–whine merger.
  has two allophones:
 Clear (neutral or somewhat palatalised)  in syllable-initial and intervocalic positions (as in look  and polar ).
 In Cultivated variety, clear  is often also used word-finally when another word begins with a vowel (as in call up , which in General and Broad is pronounced ).
 Velarised  (or uvularised ) in pre-consonantal and word-final positions.
 One source states that the dark  has a "hollow pharyngealised" quality , rather than velarised or uvularised.
John Wells analyses the broad pronunciation of these words as having a secondarily stressed schwa in the last syllable: , .
 In Cultivated and General varieties,  is an approximant, usually postalveolar or (less commonly) retroflex. In emphatic speech, Cultivated speakers may realise  as a (often long) trill . Older speakers of the Cultivated variety may realise intervocalic  as a tap  (as in very ), a feature which is becoming increasingly rare.
 Broad SAE realises  as a tap , sometimes even as a trill  - a pronunciation which is at times stigmatised as a marker of this variety. The trill  is more commonly considered a feature of the second language Afrikaans English variety.
 South African English is non-rhotic, except for some Broad varieties spoken in the Cape Province (typically in -er suffixes, as in writer ). It appears that postvocalic  is entering the speech of younger people under the influence of American English.
 Linking  (as in for a while ) is used only by some speakers: . 
 There is not a full agreement about intrusive  (as in law and order) in South African English:
  states that it is rare, and some speakers with linking  never use the intrusive .
  states that it is absent from this variety.
In contexts where many British and Australian accents use the intrusive , speakers of South African English who do not use the intrusive  create an intervocalic hiatus. In these varieties, phrases such as law and order  can be subject to the following processes:
 Vowel deletion: ;
 Adding a semivowel corresponding to the preceding vowel: ;
 Inserting a glottal stop: . This is typical of Broad varieties.

See also
 Australian English phonology
 New Zealand English phonology
 Regional accents of English

References

Bibliography

Further reading

 
 
 
 

English phonology
South African English